George Webster (died 15 July 1875) was a 19th-century Member of Parliament from Southland, New Zealand.

In 1860 while in Australia he attempted to found a state trustee in Victoria, similar to the Public Trustee (known as the Public Trust) set up in 1873 by Vogel.

He represented the Wallace electorate from 1869 to 1875, when he died.

He died on 15 July 1875 from an inflammation of the brain after a short illness.

References

1875 deaths
19th-century New Zealand politicians
Members of the New Zealand House of Representatives
New Zealand MPs for South Island electorates

Year of birth missing